Crosstown Expressway may refer to:

 Crosstown Expressway (Interstate 494), a formerly proposed highway route in Chicago, Illinois, United States
 Crosstown Expressway (Philadelphia), an unbuilt highway in Philadelphia that was to be a part of Interstate 695
 Crosstown Expressway (Toronto), a cancelled expressway project in Toronto, Ontario, Canada
 A portion of Interstate 244 in Tulsa, Oklahoma, United States, known as the Crosstown Expressway
 Interstate 579 in Pittsburgh, an expressway known as the Crosstown Boulevard
 Lee Roy Selmon Crosstown Expressway, a limited access toll road in Hillsborough County, Florida, United States
 Minnesota State Highway 62, referred to locally as the Crosstown
 Oklahoma City Crosstown Expressway, a section of Interstate 40 in Oklahoma City, Oklahoma, United States
 Tampa Bay Crosstown Expressway System
 Crosstown Parkway (Port St. Lucie), a high-capacity east/west roadway linking Interstate 95 and U.S. Route 1/State Road 5 in Port St. Lucie, Florida, United States.